"The Imperialism of Free Trade" is an academic article by John Gallagher and Ronald Robinson first published in The Economic History Review in 1953. The article was influential in the debate concerning the causes of British imperial expansion in the 19th-century which, since John A. Hobson's Imperialism: A Study (1902), had focused on economic motivation. Instead, Gallagher and Robinson claimed that the New Imperialism – "the new spate of imperial expansion that gathered momentum from the 1880s" – could be best characterised as a continuation of a longer-term policy begun in the 1850s in which informal empire, based on the principles of free trade, was favoured over formal imperial control unless circumstances made such rule impossible. As well as reigniting scholarly interest in theorizing New Imperialism, the article helped launch the Cambridge School of historiography.

The arguments proposed in the article were later developed in a full-length book, Africa and the Victorians (1961), in conjunction with Alice Denny. The book put forward a subtly different explanation for European expansion in Africa, built around geopolitics and a strategy of protecting British India from encroachment by other European powers. The strategic model and its relevance to East Africa was criticised for its limited documentary basis and sequential inconsistencies by John Darwin in 1997, a refutation that was further consolidated and contextualised by Jonas Gjersø in 2015. 

Reviewing the debate from the end of the 20th century, historian  Martin Lynn argues that Gallagher and Robinson exaggerated its impact. He says that Britain achieved its goal of increasing its economic interests in many areas, "but the broader goal of 'regenerating' societies and thereby creating regions tied as 'tributaries' to British economic interests was not attained." The reasons were:

The idea that free-trade imperial states use informal methods to secure their expanding economic influence has attracted Marxist historiographers to use the theory to describe how the modern economic policies of the United States and the imperialist policies of Great Britain are essentially the same, in both motive and method.

References

Further reading
 Cain, Peter J., and Antony Gerald Hopkins. British Imperialism: Innovation and Expansion 1688–1914 (Routledge, 2014)

Platt, D. C. M. "The Imperialism of Free Trade: Some Reservations", The Economic History Review, New Series, Vol. 21, No. 2 (Aug., 1968), pp. 296–306

External links
Talking Empire: The Gallagher-Robinson Controversy at the University of Exeter

Books about economic history
History of international trade
Works about New Imperialism
1953 documents
Academic journal articles
Historiography of the British Empire
Free trade imperialism